Robert James "Bob" Randall (1934 – 12 May 2015), also known as Uncle Bob, was an Aboriginal Australian elder, singer and community leader. He was a member of the Stolen Generations and became an elder of the Yankunytjatjara people from Central Australia. He was the 1999 National Aborigines and Islanders Day Observance Committee NAIDOC Person of the Year. His 1970 song, "My Brown Skin Baby, They Take 'im Away," is described as an "anthem" for the Stolen Generations. He was known by the honorific "Tjilpi", a word meaning "old man" that is often translated as "uncle".  He lived in Mutitjulu, the Aboriginal community at Uluru in the Northern Territory of Australia.

Early life
Randall was born  at Middleton Pond on Tempe Downs Station in the Central Desert region of the Northern Territory. His mother, Tanguawa, was a Yankuntjatjarra maid at the station. His father, William Liddle, was the White Australian owner of the station.

Around the age of seven, Randall was taken away from his mother and family under government policy which forcibly removed thousands of "half-caste" (part-Aboriginal) children from their families. This policy produced what came to be known as the "Stolen Generations". Randall was taken to The Bungalow, an institution for half-caste children in Alice Springs, Northern Territory, then later was moved to an Aboriginal reserve on Croker Island in Arnhem Land, thousands of kilometres away from his home and family. Randall was given a new identity and date of birth.

Randall was kept in government institutions until he was twenty. At that time, he, his new wife, and his baby were banished for questioning white authorities.

Community work
Randall moved to Darwin and later to Adelaide, South Australia, working, studying, establishing a career as an Aboriginal cultural educator, and looking for his family and country of belonging. He was affectionately known as "Uncle Bob" or "Tjilpi" (old man or uncle). He established Croker Island Night and several organisations in Darwin including the RRT Pony Club, Boxing Club, Folk Club, the Aboriginal Development Foundation. He worked as a counsellor through the Methodist Uniting Church.

In 1970, Randall helped establish the Adelaide Community College for Aboriginal people and lectured at the college on Aboriginal culture. He served as the director of the Northern Territory Legal Aid Service in Alice Springs.

He was a member of the committee of the Aboriginal Publications Foundation, which published the magazine Identity, in the 1970s.

He established Aboriginal and Torres Strait Islander Centres at Australian National University, University of Canberra, and University of Wollongong.

Music
Randall led a country music band that serviced regional Aboriginal communities.

In the early 1970s, Randall earned widespread recognition for his song, "My Brown Skin Baby, They Take 'Im Away," which garnered national and international attention on the issues of the Stolen Generation and opened the door for Indigenous story songwriters throughout Australia. It led to the filming of a documentary of the same name that won the Bronze Prize at the Cannes Film Festival. His lifelong efforts to retain Aboriginal culture and restore equal rights for all living were recognized in 1999, when he was named NAIDOC's "Person of the Year."

He performed on stage in Child of the Night and Dream of Reconciliation.

In 2004, he was inducted into the NT Indigenous Music Hall of Fame, recognising the historical significance of his classic story songs.

In 2013, he appeared and performed in Mbantua Festival's outdoor performance, Bungalow Song.

Film

Randall appeared in the documentary films Mixed Up Man and Secret Country by John Pilger, had roles in the movies Picnic at Hanging Rock and The Last Wave.

In 2006, Randall co-produced and narrated the documentary Kanyini with Melanie Hogan. It was voted "best documentary" at the London Australian Film Festival 2007, winner of the “Inside Film Independent Spirit Award”, and winner of the Discovery Channel "Best Documentary Award" in 2006.

In 2014 he appeared in John Pilger's film, Utopia and released two documentary films with Andrew Harvey, Songman and Living Kanyini.

Later life, death and legacy
Later in life, Randall returned to his mother's country in Mutitjulu.

His story was recorded in 2002 by the National Library of Australia for the Bringing Them Home oral history project. It also appeared in the associated publication Many Voices: Reflections on Experiences of Indigenous Child Separation. 

Randall died in Mutitjulu on 12 May 2015, aged approximately 81.

Discography

Albums 
Ballads by Bob Randall (1983) – CAAMA
Bob Randall (1984) – Imparja

Compilations 
Desert Songs 1 (1982) – CAAMA
First Australians: Songs by Aboriginals and Torres Strait Islanders (1978) – Aboriginal Artists Agency
Rebel Voices From Black Australia (1990) – Imparja
Ted Egan Presents the Aboriginals (1987) – EMI

Books
Randall authored four books, including his autobiography, Songman, and three books for children: Tracker Tjuginji, Stories From Country, and Nyuntu Ninti. He contributed his personal story of being stolen to the anthology, Stories of Belonging: Finding Where Your True Self Lives, edited by Kelly Wendorf, published in 2009.

References

External links
Profile, abc.net.au
Profile, Kanyini.com 

An interview discussing his life and spiritual journey

1930s births
2015 deaths
Australian non-fiction writers
Indigenous Australian musicians
Indigenous Australian writers
People from the Northern Territory
Members of the Stolen Generations
Date of birth unknown
20th-century Australian musicians
Australian Aboriginal elders